Oligostigma is a genus of moths of the family Crambidae described by Achille Guenée in 1854.

Species
Oligostigma chrysota (Meyrick, 1886)
Oligostigma ducale Schaus, 1906
Oligostigma ectogonalis Hampson, 1906
Oligostigma flavialbalis Hampson, 1917
Oligostigma flavimarginale (Warren, 1899)
Oligostigma flavipictalis Hampson, 1917
Oligostigma juncealis Guenée, 1854
Oligostigma metazonalis (Hampson, 1906)
Oligostigma odrianale Schaus, 1924
Oligostigma phoedralis (Walker, 1859)
Oligostigma rufiterminalis Hampson, 1917
Oligostigma semimarginale Dyar, 1914

Former species
Oligostigma albifurcalis Hampson, 1906
Oligostigma alicialis Hampson, 1908
Oligostigma andreusialis Hampson, 1912
Oligostigma angustalis Sauber in Semper, 1899
Oligostigma araealis Hampson, 1897
Oligostigma auropunctalis Hampson, 1903
Oligostigma chrysozonalis Hampson, 1912
Oligostigma excisa (Swinhoe, 1901)
Oligostigma fumibasalis Hampson, 1896
Oligostigma hapilista Swinhoe, 1892
Oligostigma melanotalis Hampson, 1906
Oligostigma ornatum Moore
Oligostigma parvalis Moore, 1877

References

George Mathew, 2006. An Inventory of Indian Pyralids (Lepidoptera: Pyralidae). Zoos' Print Journal 21(5): 2245-2258

Acentropinae
Crambidae genera
Taxa named by Achille Guenée